Michael Flynn McDonald (born 8 November 1950) was a footballer who played in The Football League for Stoke City as well as a number of Scottish clubs.

Career
McDonald was born in Glasgow and played with St Roch's and Clydebank before joining Stoke City in 1972. His transfer to Stoke came about when, in October 1972, Stoke's World Cup-winning goalkeeper Gordon Banks was involved in a near fatal car crash which left him blind in one eye and ended his top flight career. Manager Tony Waddington wanted Scotland international Bobby Clark to be his replacement but he failed to impress the Stoke board and the move fell through. So Instead Banks' understudy John Farmer was made first choice and McDonald was brought in as his back-up. He made just nine appearances for Stoke in two seasons and returned north of the border to Hibernian. He later went on to play for Berwick Rangers, Hawick Royal Albert, St Johnstone and Arbroath.

McDonald later managed Gala Fairydean. He was banned from the touchline for 18 months in April 1989 by the Scottish Football Association. In December 2014 McDonald was appointed joint-manager at non-league Congleton Town.

Career statistics

References

External links
 

Scottish footballers
Stoke City F.C. players
Hibernian F.C. players
Clydebank F.C. (1965) players
Berwick Rangers F.C. players
St Johnstone F.C. players
Arbroath F.C. players
English Football League players
1950 births
Living people
Scottish Football League players
Footballers from Glasgow
Association football goalkeepers
Scottish football managers
Gala Fairydean Rovers F.C. managers
Hawick Royal Albert F.C. players
Congleton Town F.C. managers